The Unfair Contract Terms Act 1977 (c 50) is an Act of Parliament of the United Kingdom which regulates contracts by restricting the operation and legality of some contract terms. It extends to nearly all forms of contract and one of its most important functions is limiting the applicability of disclaimers of liability. The terms extend to both actual contract terms and notices that are seen to constitute a contractual obligation.

The Act renders terms excluding or limiting liability ineffective or subject to reasonableness, depending on the nature of the obligation purported to be excluded and whether the party purporting to exclude or limit business liability, acting against a consumer.

It is normally used in conjunction with the Unfair Terms in Consumer Contracts Regulations 1999 (Statutory Instrument 1999 No. 2083), as well as the Sale of Goods Act 1979 and the Supply of Goods and Services Act 1982.

The Law Commission and the Scottish Law Commission have recommended that the Unfair Terms in Consumer Contracts Regulations 1999 and the Unfair Contract Terms Act 1977 should be replaced by a more unified and coherent regime. As of 2015, the Law Commission's recommendations were implemented in part by Part 2 of the Consumer Rights Act 2015

Terms rendered ineffective

Negligence. s2(1), liability for negligence occasioning death or personal injury cannot be excluded.

Manufacturers' guarantee. s5(1), loss arising from (a) defective goods or (b) negligence of distributor cannot be excluded where goods are "of a type ordinarily supplied for private use or consumption".

Sale of goods
s6(1), implied terms as to title (Sale of Goods Act 1979 s12) cannot be excluded.
s6(2), implied terms as to description, quality or sample (Sale of Goods Act 1979 ss13-15) cannot be excluded against a consumer.

Terms governed by the Consumer Protection Act 1987.

They are also governed (since 2007) by the Occupiers Liability Act 1984.

Terms subject to reasonableness
Negligence. s2(2), exclusion of liability for all types of negligence (other than for death or personal injury which is banned) must satisfy the requirement of reasonableness.

Contractual liability. s3, This applies against a party that deals on standard written terms or where the other party deals as a consumer. Any exclusion by that party for liability arising from a breach committed by that party under the same contract (s3(2)(a)) or performance under a contract which is substantially or totally different of that which is reasonably expected of him (s(3)(b)) shall be void except insofar as it satisfies the requirement of reasonableness.

Indemnity clauses. s4, A party dealing as a consumer cannot contract to indemnify a third party on behalf of the other party, except insofar as it satisfies the requirement of reasonableness.

Sale of goods. s6(3), Implied terms as to description, quality and sample (Sale of Goods Act 1979 ss 13–15) may only be reasonably excluded where neither party is dealing as a consumer.

Misrepresentation. s8, substitutes the Misrepresentation Act 1967 s3. Under that post-1979 section, an exclusion of liability for misrepresentation must satisfy the requirement of reasonableness.

Definition of consumer and business

Business. s 1(3), The Act only applies to "liability for breach of obligations or duties arising (a) from things done or to be done by a person in the course of a business (whether his own business or another's); or (b) from the occupation of premises used for business purposes of the occupier". s14, Includes any government department.

Consumer. s 12, A party deals as a consumer if
s12(1)(a), He is not in the course of a business and does not hold himself to do so.
s12(1)(b), the other party is in the course of a business.
s12(1)(c), In a contract for sale of goods, the goods are of a type "ordinarily supplied for private use or consumption" (s12(1A), this subsection does not apply to individuals)
s12(2), A party is not a consumer if dealing at an auction where he has the opportunity to attend in person or is not a natural person buying auction.
s12(3), Burden is upon the party purported to be acting in the course of a business to show that either he is not in the course of a business or that the other party is otherwise not a consumer.

Definition of reasonableness

Section 11 provides some guidance but most development has been in common law.

Schedule 2 gives guidelines specifically to ss 6(3), 7(3), 7(4).

Case law
Stewart Gill Ltd v Horatio Myer & Co Ltd. provides that reasonableness is assessed at the time of contract; and that the burden of proof is upon the party purporting to have excluded liability.
Levison v Patent Steam Carpet Cleaning Co Ltd. provides that clarity and preciseness will raise the reasonableness of a term; and vice versa. See also Stag Line Ltd v Tyne Ship Repair Group Ltd. as to small print (literally – relating to the size of the lettering).
Smith v Eric S Bush. Lord Griffith provides four points that may be considered (see application in St Albans City and District Council v International Computers Ltd):
Equality of bargaining powers.
How practical was it to obtain independent legal advice regarding the term?
How difficult is the task being undertaken for which liability is being excluded?
What are the practical consequences of ruling that a term is unreasonable?
Pegler v Wang (2000) is an exclusion of liability case noted within a family of legal cases relating to "system supply contracts", relating to the purchase of an IT system which, the customer argued, did not do what was wanted. The purchasers (Pegler) had made it clear that they preferred a system installation whose performance could be "certainly guaranteed" rather than a better-functioning system whose operation might not be satisfactory. The exemption clause in this particular case was held to be unreasonable, and the judge made an order for rectification of the contract to include certain correspondence relied on by Pegler. A further hearing arose as to costs.
Other relevant cases include Watford Electronics v Sanderson (2001), South West Water v ICL [1999] BLR 420 and Horace Holman Group Ltd v Sherwood International Group Ltd. (2000) (Unrep, 12th April 2000).

See also

Standard form contract
Consumer Rights Act 2015
Unfair Terms in Consumer Contracts Regulations 1999
Electronic Commerce Regulations 2002
Office of Fair Trading v Abbey National and Others (2008) - Bank charges test case
Britvic Soft Drinks Ltd v Messer UK Ltd [2002] EWCA Civ 548
Commerzbank AG v Keen [2007] IRLR 132
Baltic Shipping Company v Dillon (1993) 176 CLR 344

Notes

References
PS Atiyah, An Introduction to the Law of Contract (Clarendon, Oxford 2000)
H Collins, Contract Law in Context (CUP 2004)
E McKendrick, Contract Law (8th edn Palgrave 2009)
J Hilliard and J O’Sullivan, The Law of Contract (2nd edn OUP 2006)
A Burrows, A Casebook on Contract (2nd edn Hart, Oxford 2009)
Jill Poole, Casebook on Contract Law (2006) 8th Ed., Oxford University Press
Ewan McKendrick, Contract Law - Text, Cases and Materials (2005) Oxford University Press 

United Kingdom Acts of Parliament 1977
English contract law
Terms of service